Herbert George Batten (14 May 1898 – 1956) was an English professional footballer who played as an inside left.

Career
Born in Bristol, Batten played for Bristol City, Plymouth Argyle, Everton, Bradford City, Reading and Clapton Orient. For Plymouth Argyle, he made 88 appearances in the Football League; he also made 6 appearances in Cup competitions. For Everton, he made 15 appearances in the Football League. For Bradford City, he made 24 appearances in the Football League.

Sources

References

1898 births
1956 deaths
English footballers
Bristol City F.C. players
Plymouth Argyle F.C. players
Everton F.C. players
Bradford City A.F.C. players
Reading F.C. players
Leyton Orient F.C. players
English Football League players
Association football inside forwards